Lu Zhonggui (30 September 1868 – 7 November 1895), courtesy name Xianxiang, better known as Lu Haodong, was a Chinese revolutionary who lived in the late Qing dynasty. He is best known for designing the Blue Sky with a White Sun flag that became the party flag and emblem of the Kuomintang (KMT; Chinese Nationalist Party), and the canton of the flag of the Republic of China.

Life
Lu was born in Shanghai but his ancestral home was in Xiangshan County (now is Zhongshan), Guangdong. He was a friend of Sun Yat-sen and was involved in activities targeted at overthrowing the Qing dynasty and establishing a republic in China. In 1895, Lu co-founded the Revive China Society in Hong Kong with Sun Yat-sen. In October 1895, they planned to stage an uprising in Guangzhou, but the Qing government got wind of their plan. On 26 October, Lu was preparing to escape from Guangzhou, but decided to return to their base of operations in a church in present-day Beijinglu, Yuexiu District to burn a roster containing the names of the revolutionaries and other important documents. He could not escape in time and was arrested along with other revolutionaries by the Qing government.

Lu was taken to the yamen in Nanhai County (present-day Nanhai District, Foshan, Guangdong) for interrogation by the county magistrate Li Zhengyong, who was acting under instructions from Tan Zhonglin, the Viceroy of Liangguang. When he refused to kneel down before Li during questioning, the magistrate said, "You are a talented young man. Why did you want to get yourself in trouble that would cost you your life? I feel sorry for you that you don't value your life." Lu replied sternly, "China is a vast country and it has the highest population in the world, but it is poor and weak because the Qing government is authoritarian and incompetent in foreign policy. My comrades and I originally planned an uprising with the aim of overthrowing the Qing government and replacing it with a new republican government. I intended to kill one or two persons like you who serve the Qing government. Now that our plan has failed, I can't kill you but you can kill me. What's there to feel sorry about?"

The American embassy in Guangzhou attempted to save Lu's life by claiming that he was a translator working at the telegraph office and was not a revolutionary. However, they could not do anything when Li Zhengyong showed them a confession written by Lu himself. Lu, Zhu Guiquan, Qiu Si and other captured revolutionaries were executed on 7 November by the order of Tan Zhonglin. Sun Yat-sen called Lu "the first person in Chinese history who sacrificed his life for a democratic revolution".

Lu is credited for designing the Blue Sky with a White Sun flag that became the party flag and emblem of the Kuomintang (KMT; Chinese Nationalist Party), and the canton of the flag of the Republic of China.

Portrayals in media
Lu is portrayed as a supporting character by Hong Kong actor David Chiang in the 1992 film Once Upon a Time in China II. In the film, Lu is shot to death by Qing soldiers while trying to escape from Guangzhou with help from Wong Fei-hung.

See also
 Blue Sky with a White Sun
 Kuomintang
 History of the Republic of China

References

 

1868 births
1895 deaths
Chinese revolutionaries
19th-century Calvinist and Reformed Christians
People from Zhongshan
Chinese Christians
Flag designers